Edie Meidav (born 1967) is an American novelist.

Life
She graduated with a B.A., Yale University, and M.F.A., Mills College.

Her works include Kingdom of the Young, a collection of fiction with a nonfiction coda; Lola, California, a novel concerning death penalty, motherhood, female friendship, and the cultural aftermath of 1960s idealism; Crawl Space, a novel written in the voice of a Vichy criminal reckoning with the commodification of wartime memory; The Far Field: A Novel of Ceylon, set in Sri Lanka and concerning the effects of the Western gaze on the East.

Her fiction, poetry, and criticism have appeared in Writing on Air (MIT Press), On Globalization (MIT Press), Now Write! Fiction Writing Exercises from Today's Best Teachers and Writers (Penguin, 2006), and other anthologies, and in Lithub, The Millions, Village Voice, Conjunctions, The American Voice, Ms., The Kenyon Review, The Chattahoochee Review.

The former director of the MFA in Writing and Consciousness, New College of California, San Francisco, she also taught at Lang College New School for Social Research, New York City. A former writer-in-residence at Bard College, in upstate New York, she is now part of the faculty in the MFA at the University of Massachusetts at Amherst.  She is on Twitter at lolacalifornia, and on Instagram as meidav. She has two daughters.

Awards
 Fulbright Awards in Sri Lanka and Cyprus
 Howard Fellowship
 Lannan Literary Fellowship (2007)
 Bard Fiction Prize (2005). (2006– )
 Janet Heidinger Kafka Prize for best novel by an American Woman 2001
 Los Angeles Times Best Books of 2001
 Los Angeles Times Best Book of 2006

Works
  (reprint Harcourt, 2002)
  (reprint Macmillan, 2006)
 
 Meidav, Edie (2017). Kingdom of the Young. Sarabande Books. 
 Meidav, Edie (2022). Another Love Discourse. MIT Press.

Criticism

Reviews
Edie Meidav is a student of human bewilderment. In her first novel—about an American called Henry Gould trying to establish a utopian community in the British colony of Ceylon—she's woven the blundering figure of a holy fool into a bristling tapestry of local life. The Far Field is historical fiction without a shred of nostalgia, and even its sometimes predictable plot is finally justified by Meidav's scarifying emotional honesty and visceral sense of place.

But while Meidav's lens is panoramic, she manages to keep her focus human in scale, providing her readers with a virtual novelistic treatise on the colonial experience, articulated in the accumulated tiny, believable details of her characters' daily lives.

References

External links
Author's website
"Scott Esposito & Edie Meidav", ''The Bat Segundo Sh #51: OGIC, www.batsegundo.com
"Edie Meidav", KQED Arts

Canadian emigrants to the United States
Yale University alumni
Mills College alumni
Bard College faculty
21st-century American novelists
American women novelists
1967 births
Living people
The New School faculty
21st-century American women writers
Novelists from New York (state)
Writers from Toronto
American women academics